Frances England is a children's musician from San Francisco, CA. Her style of music is generally described as Indie and/or Folk. In 2006, England wrote her first album of songs entitled Fascinating Creatures as a fundraiser for her son's preschool and recorded it with the help of artist Billy Riggs. The album went on to be the sole recipient of the 2007 Oppenheim Platinum Award for Music. Her 2nd CD, Family Tree was released in 2008 and received the Gold Parent's Choice Award and the Gold Nappa Award for 2008. Her 3rd and 4th albums, Mind of My Own (2011) and Blink of an Eye (2013) also received Gold Parent's Choice Awards. Frances' 5th Album, Explorer of the World (2016) was awarded another Gold Parent's Choice Award along with being ranked #1 for 2016 in the annual Fids and Kamily Music Awards compiled by the top children's radio programmers and music writers in the country.

On December 6, 2016, Frances received her first Grammy nomination for Best Children's Album for Explorer of the World.

England occasionally plays live shows in the San Francisco Bay Area with Stewart Peck (guitar/vocals) and Chris Chan (drums/keyboard).

Discography
 Fascinating Creatures (2006)
 Family Tree (2008)
 Mind of My Own (2010)
 Blink of an Eye (2013)
 Paths We Have Worn
 Explorer of the World (2016)

References

Further reading
 Cookie Magazine top ten kids albums of 2008
 LA Times Review of Family Tree
 School Library Journal - 12 Kids' Albums You Can't Live Without

External links
 Frances England's Official Music Website
 59TH Annual Grammy Awards (Nominees)
 Kids and Family Music Poll - Top Albums of 2016
 Kids and Family Music Poll - Top Albums of 2013
 Kids and Family Music Poll - Top Albums of 2008
 Kids and Family Music Poll - Top Albums of 2006

Musicians from San Francisco
Year of birth missing (living people)
Living people
American children's musicians